John Pagus (fl. first half of the 13th century) was a scholastic philosopher at the University of Paris, generally considered the first logician writing at the Arts faculty at Paris.

Life
He is thought to have been a Master of Arts in the 1220s and to have taught Peter of Spain. At that time he was writing on syncategorematic terms.

Works
Appellationes
Commentary on the Sentences
Rationes super Predicamenta Aristotelis
Syncategoremata

Notes

References
 Hein Hansen (ed.) John Pagus on Aristotle's Categories. A Study and Edition of the Rationes super Praedicamenta, Leuven: Leuven University Press, 2012.
 Alain De Libera, Les Appellationes de Jean le Page, in  Archives d'histoire doctrinale et littéraire du moyen âge, 51, 1984 pp. 193–255.

External links
 Jakob Hans Josef Schneider (1992). "Johannes Pagus (Pagius, Jean le Page, John Page)". In Bautz, Friedrich Wilhelm. Biographisch-Bibliographisches Kirchenlexikon (BBKL) (in German) 3. Herzberg: Bautz. cols. 505–507. .
 Works listed

13th-century philosophers
Scholastic philosophers
French logicians
13th-century deaths
Year of birth unknown
Year of death unknown